Charles Henry Graham (April 24, 1878 – August 29, 1948), known as "Uncle Charlie", was an American baseball catcher, manager and team owner. He was born in Santa Clara, California.

Graham played and coached for Santa Clara College before entering Major League Baseball during the 1906 season with the Boston Americans. In one season career, he was a .233 hitter (21-for-90) with one home run and 12 RBI in 30 games, including 10 runs, one double, and one stolen base. Following his majors career, he played and coached in the minor leagues.

 In 1918, Graham became manager and part owner of the PCL San Francisco Seals. He managed until 1921 and eventually took control of front office. Under his management the Seals moved to their own park, Seals Stadium, in 1931. The Seals won pennants in 1922, 1923, 1925, 1928, 1931, 1935 and 1946, to become one of the most successful teams in PCL history. Their rosters included several future major league stars, such as Earl Averill, Joe DiMaggio, Smead Jolley and Paul Waner, as well as Lefty O'Doul as the team's manager. In 1946 the Seals had a new co-owner, Paul Fagan, who eventually bought the team outright from Graham.

Graham died in San Francisco, California, at age 70. A dormitory at Santa Clara University is named in his honor. One of his sons, Robert A. Graham joined the Jesuits and became a leading authority on the Vatican's World War II history.

References

External links

 Retrosheet

1878 births
1948 deaths
Major League Baseball catchers
Boston Americans players
Santa Clara Broncos baseball coaches
Minor league baseball executives
San Jose (minor league baseball) players
San Jose Brewers players
Stockton Wasps players
Pueblo Indians players
San Francisco Wasps players
Sacramento Gilt Edges players
Sacramento Senators players
Tacoma Tigers players
Sacramento Cordovas players
Sacramento Sacts players
Sacramento Solons managers
San Francisco Seals (baseball) managers
Santa Clara University alumni
Sportspeople from Santa Clara, California
Baseball players from California